Paranoia Agent Original Soundtrack is the soundtrack to the TV series Paranoia Agent composed by Susumu Hirasawa. The CDs catalog number is #5274, and is labeled by Geneon Entertainment, the same company that holds the English language rights to the anime series in the US.

Track listing

"Condition Boy" contains a sample of "Kun Mae #3" by Syun, from the album Kun Mae on a Calculation.
"Cultivation" was sampled by Kaku P-Model for "Cruise Psyclaon", from the album Vistoron.

Outtake Collection
On May 16, 2004, Hirasawa released outtakes of the soundtrack, which are alternate arrangements of song melodies that were included in the final soundtrack and one unused theme, on his website.

Personnel
Susumu Hirasawa - Voice, Electronic keyboard, Amiga, Personal computer, Digital audio workstation, Synthesizers, Sampler, Sequencer, Programming, Production
Masanori Chinzei - Recording, Mixing, Mastering
mediaHYPERIUM Studios - Mastering (US release)
Rihito Yumoto and Mika Hirano (Chaos Union) - A&R
Kiyoshi Inagaki - Design
Koyo Graphic International - Design (US release)
Masaru Owaku - Photography, Photographic Processing
Syotaro Takami - Translation
Michiko Powers - Production (US release)
Nobu Yamamoto - Executive production (US release)

External links
Paranoia Agent Original Soundtrack official website
Paranoia Agent Original Soundtrack on NO ROOM

Reverie Hill, released for free at Hirasawa's official website
Songs from the series not found in the soundtrack at Hirasawa's official website

Anime soundtracks
Paranoia Agent
Susumu Hirasawa albums
2004 soundtrack albums